Richárd Horváth (born 11 May 1992, in Budapest) is a Hungarian striker player who currently plays for Újpest FC.

Club statistics

Updated to games played as of 1 June 2014.

External links
 Nemzeti sport  
 HLSZ 

Living people
1992 births
Footballers from Budapest
Hungarian footballers
Association football forwards
Újpest FC players
Lombard-Pápa TFC footballers
Nemzeti Bajnokság I players